The Federal advisory council or (FAC) is a body composed of representatives chosen by each of the twelve Federal Reserve Banks that "consults with and advises the Board on all matters within the Board's jurisdiction."

Membership
President - William Downe
Vice President - Lyle R. Knight
First District - Joseph L. Hooley
Second District - James P. Gorman
Third District - Bharat B. Masrani
Fourth District - James E. Rohr
Fifth District - Richard D. Fairbank
Sixth District - Daryl G. Byrd
Seventh District - David W. Nelms
Eight District - Bryan Jordan
Ninth District - Ken Karels 
Tenth District - Stanley A. Lybarger
Eleventh District - Richard W. Evans, Jr.
Twelfth District - J. Michael Shepherd
Secretary - James E. Annable

References

External links

Federal Advisory Council at the Federal Reserve
Minutes and Recommendations of the Federal Advisory Council, 1914-1968

Federal Reserve System